The girls' singles table tennis event was a part of the table tennis program at the 2010 Summer Youth Olympics and took place at the Singapore Indoor Stadium. The tournament started on August 21 with the final on August 23.

32 athletes took part in the girls' single event. Athletes were split into eight groups where they would play a round robin.  The top two from each group would proceed to the next round where they are placed in another group where another round robin is played, while the bottom two from the first round played in a consolation round robin.  The top two from that group would proceed to the quarterfinals where there was a single elimination tournament with a bronze medal final.

Medalists

Group stages

Round 1

Group A

Group B

Group C

Group D

Group E

Group F

Group G

Group H

Round 2

Group AA

Group BB

Group CC

Group DD

Consolation round

Bottom two athletes from each group in round 1 compete here.

Group EE

Group FF

Group GG

Group HH

Knockout stage

References
 Results

Table tennis at the 2010 Summer Youth Olympics
Women's sports competitions in Singapore